The 2004 Moorilla Hobart International was a women's tennis tournament played on outdoor hard courts and which was part of the Tier V category of the 2004 WTA Tour. It was the 11th edition of the tournament and took place at the Hobart International Tennis Centre in Hobart, Australia from 12 January until 16 January 2004. Unseeded Amy Frazier won the singles title and earned $16,000 first-prize money.

Finals

Singles

 Amy Frazier defeated  Shinobu Asagoe, 6–3, 6–3
 It was Frazier's 1st singles title of the year and the 7th of her career.

Doubles

 Shinobu Asagoe /  Seiko Okamoto defeated  Els Callens /  Barbara Schett 2–6, 6–4, 6–3

References

External links
 ITF tournament edition details
 Tournament draws

Hobart International
Moorilla Hobart International
Moorilla Hobart International